Reiter In is the thirteenth album by singer-songwriter and guitarist, Chris Whitley. It is his eleventh studio album and the last he made before his death (five months later, at 45) in November 2005.

The album was recorded as a band effort and is billed as "Chris Whitley & The Bastard Club".

Kenny Siegal (of Johnny Society) produced, co-wrote, and played on the album. It was recorded all analog and live on a two-inch tape Sony MCI JH24 tape deck through a Trident board at Old Soul Studios in Catskill, New York. It was mixed by John Holbrook.

Track listing
All tracks written by Chris Whitley unless otherwise noted.

 "I Wanna Be Your Dog" (Dave Alexander, Ron Asheton, Scott Asheton, Iggy Pop – The Stooges) – 4:08
 "Bring It On Home" (Willie Dixon – Sonny Boy Williamson II) – 3:43
 "Inn" (Brian Geltner, Chris Whitley) – 4:06
 "Mountain Side" (Wayne Coyne, Jonathan Donahue, Michael Ivins, Nathan Roberts – The Flaming Lips) – 5:15
 "Cut the Cards" (Tim Beattie) – 4:38
 "I'm in Love with a German Film Star" (Mitch Barker, Barbara Gogan, Clive Temperley, Claire Bidwell, Richard Williams – The Passions) – 4:28
 "Are 'Friends' Electric?" (Gary Numan) – 5:11
 "Reiter In" – 5:16
 "I Go Evil" (Chris Whitley, Kenny Siegal) – 4:30
 "All Beauty Taken from You in This Life Remains Forever" (Chris Whitley, Kenny Siegal) – 7:04
 "Come Home" (Heiko Schramm) – 3:19

Personnel 
Chris Whitley – lead vocals and guitars
Heiko Schramm – bass guitar and backing vocals
Brian Geltner – drums, vibes, acoustic guitar, and backing vocals
Tim Beattie – harmonica, lap steel, and backing vocals
Kenny Siegal – baritone guitar, electric guitar, acoustic guitar, and backing vocals
Sean Balin – violin
Gwen Snyder – vocals and tambourine
Susann Bürger – spoken word

References

2006 albums
Chris Whitley albums